The 2021–22 Formosa Taishin Dreamers season was the franchise's 5th season, its second season in the P. LEAGUE+ (PLG). The Dreamers are coached by Kyle Julius in his third year as head coach.

The Dreamers play their home games in Intercontinental Basketball Stadium this season due to the renovation of Changhua County Stadium.

Draft 

The Dreamers' 2021 first-round draft pick was traded to Kaohsiung Steelers in exchange for cash considerations. On July 29, 2021, Dreamers announced that the second rounder, Wang Wei-Cheng has forfeited to sign.

Standings

Roster

Game log

Taiwan 3x3 Basketball Association

Round 1

Round 2

Round 3

Round 4

Round 5

Round 6

Round 7

Final

Preseason

Regular season

Playoffs

Player Statistics 
<noinclude>

Regular season

Playoffs

 Reference：

Transactions

Overview

Free Agency

Additions

Subtractions

Awards

End-of-Season Awards

Players of the Month

Players of the Week

Notes

References 

Formosa Taishin Dreamers seasons
Formosa Taishin Dreamers